Sait Karafırtınalar (born 1 January 1969) is a Turkish football coach and former player who is the manager of Boluspor.

References

1969 births
Living people
Sportspeople from İzmir
Turkish footballers
Bucaspor footballers
Turgutluspor footballers
Balıkesirspor footballers
Anadolu Üsküdar 1908 footballers
Turkish football managers
Bucaspor managers
Karşıyaka S.K. managers
Kayseri Erciyesspor managers
Manisaspor managers
Boluspor managers
Altay S.K. managers
Association footballers not categorized by position
Ümraniyespor managers
Adanaspor managers